Robert Cousins could refer to:

 Robert G. Cousins (1859–1933), American politician
 Robert J. Cousins (born 1941), American nutrition scientist
 Robert K. Cousins, American playwright